Idaho Legislative District 16 is one of 35 districts of the Idaho Legislature. It is currently represented by Grant Burgoyne, Democrat  of Boise, John McCrostie, Democrat of Garden City, and Hy Kloc, Democrat of Boise.

District profile (2012–present) 
District 16 currently consists of a portion of Ada County.

District profile (2002–2012) 
From 2002 to 2012, District 16 consisted of a portion of Ada County.

District profile (1992–2002) 
From 1992 to 2002, District 16 consisted of a portion of Ada County.

Molly Lazechko (Democratic)

See also

 List of Idaho Senators
 List of Idaho State Representatives

References

External links
Idaho Legislative District Map (with members)
Idaho Legislature (official site)

16
Ada County, Idaho